The Rudrapur Municipal Corporation is the highest governing body of the city of Rudrapur in Uttarakhand, India.

Structure 
This corporation consists of 40 wards  and is headed by a mayor who presides over a deputy mayor and 39 other corporators representing the wards. The mayor is elected directly through a first-past-the-post voting system and the deputy mayor is elected by the corporators from among their numbers.

List of mayors

List of Municipal Commissioners

References

Rudrapur, Uttarakhand
Municipal corporations in Uttarakhand
Year of establishment missing